Acleris flavopterana is a species of moth of the family Tortricidae. It is found in China (Yunnan).

The wingspan is about 14.1 mm. The forewings range from yellowish brown to brown. The hindwings are greyish brown. Adults have been recorded on wing in March.

References

Moths described in 1993
flavopterana
Moths of Asia